Helen Keller Services for the Blind is an American organization that helps the blind develop independence.

Since 1893 Helen Keller Services for the Blind's mission has been to help individuals of all ages who are blind or visually impaired, and who may have additional disabilities, develop independence.  Headquartered in Brooklyn, New York, the agency has additional rehabilitation sites in Hempstead and Huntington, Long Island, and operates the Helen Keller National Center for Deaf-Blind Youths and Adults in Sands Point, New York.

History
On November 2, 1883, 17-year-old Eben Porter Morford went to a local drug store in Brooklyn where he was shot. Total blindness resulted. In 1886 Morford gathered a small group of blind people together to try to help others like themselves.  On October 1, 1893, the Industrial Home for Blind Men opened its doors.  Morford became the superintendent and by 1894 seventeen blind men lived in the home.

On April 25, 1895, The Industrial Home for the Blind of the City of Brooklyn (IHB) was incorporated.  Morford spent 30 years directing the Home.  In 1906 he participated in a study on the needs of blind people in New York State.  This helped inaugurate The New York State Commission for the Blind.  In 1917 services for people who were deaf-blind were established. Also that year Morford employed a young Peter J. Salmon, who was legally blind.  Morford died January 27, 1928.  That year over 600 people who were blind or deaf-blind were served by IHB.

In 1943, on the 50th anniversary, Helen Keller visited IHB. 

During the 1950s, services were established in Nassau and Suffolk counties.  In 1952 IHB established a braille and large print library to make sure that textbooks were available for children who were blind and mainstreamed within their local schools. Also in 1952, George Hellinger opened the first Low Vision Eye Service within a blindness agency. The purpose of this service is the optimization of remaining vision of legally blind individuals through the use of optical aids. In 1953 a summer day camp was started to encourage participation in sports, music and drama.

In 1967 IHB opened a preschool for children.

During the 1960s, IHB initiated the federally funded Anne Sullivan Macy Service for people who were deaf-blind. Soon after, Peter Salmon, Louis Bettica and others advocated a national center to serve all Americans who were deaf-blind.  In 1967 the Helen Keller National Center was established by a unanimous act of Congress, and IHB was chosen to operate the program, which provided comprehensive rehabilitation training for people with a severe dual sensory loss or impairment.

In 1983 IHB established a day treatment program for adults who are developmentally disabled and who are also blind or deaf-blind.

In 1985, the Board of Trustees changed the name of IHB to the Helen Keller Services for the Blind.

Services
Helen Keller Services for the Blind's programs include:

Comprehensive Rehabilitation Services – training in safe travel, daily living skills, and braille, as well as social support, for approximately 2,000 clients each year;
Low Vision Clinics – optometrists teach clients how to maximize residual vision by using specialized lighting, lenses and magnifiers;
Children’s Learning Center – educational and therapeutic services for young children, birth to age five, who are blind and/or have other disabilities, with a resource center for families founded by Rhoda Clamen and Frank Simpson in September 1988;
Vocational Assessment and Job Placement – employment services for adults seeking work in a variety of career areas;
Assistive Technology Centers – assessment and training in the use of adaptive software for computers;
Preschool Vision Screening Program – screens nearly 25,000 children a year for eye disorders;
Camp Helen Keller – six-week summer day camp for children ages 4–15;
Children’s Saturday Program – recreational, educational, and vocational activities for children during the school year;
Louis Anzalone Braille Center – produces textbooks in Braille and large-print for students in grades K-12;
Senior Centers – group activities and social services for individuals over the age of 55;
Day Treatment Program – educational and therapeutic services for adults who are blind and have additional developmental disabilities;
Individualized Residential Alternative – community residence for six-day treatment.

External links

Blindness organizations in the United States
Services for the Blind